Horaglanis is a genus of small airbreathing catfishes that are endemic to Kerala in India. The four known species are all adapted to life underground, lack pigmentation and are blind.

This genus and Kryptoglanis, both from the Western Ghats, are the only known underground-living catfish in India.

Species 
There are currently four recognized species in this genus:
 Horaglanis abdulkalami Subhash Babu, 2012
 Horaglanis alikunhii Subhash Babu & C. K. G. Nayar, 2004
 Horaglanis krishnai Menon, 1950 (Indian blind catfish)
 Horaglanis populi Raghavan, Sundar, Arjun, Britz & Dahanukar, 2023

References

 
Catfish genera
˜
Freshwater fish genera
Taxonomy articles created by Polbot
Cave fish